The following table list the first Olympic gold medal won by each National Olympic Committee (NOC).

James Brendan Connolly of the United States is credited as the first ever gold medalist of the modern Olympic Games.

In some cases, a NOC may garner multiple gold medals in the same edition where it won its first ever gold medal. Scheduling of events is a factor that plays a part in who is considered the first Olympic gold medalist for a nation.

Names in italic are national entities that no longer exist.

Summer Olympics

Winter Olympics

See also
All-time Olympic Games medal table

Notes

References

First Olympic gold medal by country
First Olympic gold medal by country
Olympic gold medalists